Peter Fleming and John McEnroe defeated Bob Lutz and Stan Smith in the final, 6–4, 6–4, 6–4 to win the gentlemen's doubles title at the 1981 Wimbledon Championships. It was the pair's second Wimbledon men's doubles title. McEnroe also won the singles event for the first time that year.

Peter McNamara and Paul McNamee were the defending champions, but were defeated in the semifinals by Lutz and Smith.

Seeds

  Peter Fleming /  John McEnroe (champions)
  Peter McNamara /  Paul McNamee (semifinals)
  Bob Lutz /  Stan Smith (final)
 n/a
  Heinz Günthardt /  Balázs Taróczy (third round)
  Marty Riessen /  Sherwood Stewart (second round)
  Bruce Manson /  Brian Teacher (first round)
  Brian Gottfried /  Raúl Ramírez (third round)
  Kevin Curren /  Steve Denton (second round)
 n/a
  Tim Gullikson /  Bernard Mitton (second round)
  Fritz Buehning /  Ferdi Taygan (quarterfinals)
  Pavel Složil /  Tomáš Šmíd (second round)
  Andrew Pattison /  Butch Walts (first round)
  Craig Edwards /  Eddie Edwards (first round)
  Frew McMillan /  Buster Mottram (third round)

Draw

Finals

Top half

Section 1

Section 2

Bottom half

Section 3

Section 4

References

External links

1981 Wimbledon Championships – Men's draws and results at the International Tennis Federation

Men's Doubles
Wimbledon Championship by year – Men's doubles